Henry H. and Bettie S. Knight Farm is a historic farm and national historic district located near Knightdale, Wake County, North Carolina.  The district encompasses six contributing buildings on a family farm located near Knightdale.  The farmhouse was built around 1890, and is a 1 1/2-story, Queen Anne style frame dwelling with a cross-gable roof and a series of later additions and alterations. The other contributing buildings are the dairy (c. 1890), storage building (c. 1900), storage shed (c. 1900), and two barns (c. 1890 and c. 1900).

It was listed on the National Register of Historic Places in 1988.

References

Farms on the National Register of Historic Places in North Carolina
Historic districts on the National Register of Historic Places in North Carolina
Queen Anne architecture in North Carolina
Houses completed in 1890
Buildings and structures in Wake County, North Carolina
National Register of Historic Places in Wake County, North Carolina